Douglas Bernard Armstrong (born 10 January 1996) is a Canadian double-mini trampoline gymnast, representing his nation at international competitions. He competed at world championships, including at the 2015 Trampoline World Championships, where he won the silver medal in the double-mini team event.

References

External links
 
 Gymnastics Canada profile
 Langley Times

1996 births
Living people
Canadian male trampolinists
Medalists at the Trampoline Gymnastics World Championships
21st-century Canadian people